Berekhya is a moshav in southern Israel. Located four kilometres east of Ashkelon, it falls under the jurisdiction of Hof Ashkelon Regional Council.

History
The moshav was founded in the winter of 1950 by immigrants from the Tunisian island of Djerba, who had formed a community whilst in a camp in Pardes Hana. Its name is an expression of the founders' wishes for the blessing (Brakha) of God.

References

Moshavim
Populated places established in 1950
Populated places in Southern District (Israel)
Tunisian-Jewish culture in Israel
1950 establishments in Israel